Euthria bernardi is a species of sea snail, a marine gastropod mollusk in the family Buccinidae, the true whelks.

Description
The length of the shell attains 60.5 mm.

Distribution
This marine species occurs off the Cape Verdes.

References

 Fraussen, K.; Rolán, E. (2003). Four new Euthria (Gastropoda: Buccinidae) from the Cape Verde Archipelago. Gloria Maris. 42(4-5): 76-93
 Rolán E., 2005. Malacological Fauna From The Cape Verde Archipelago. Part 1, Polyplacophora and Gastropoda.
 Fraussen K. & Swinnen F. (2016). A review of the genus Euthria Gray, 1839 (Gastropoda: Buccinidae) from the Cape Verde archipelago. Xenophora Taxonomy. 11: 9-31

External links

Buccinidae
Gastropods described in 2003